Bocula wuyiensis is a moth of the family Erebidae first described by Jia-Bao Sun, Hai-Qing Hu and Hui-Lin Han in 2008. It is found in China.

References 
Sun, Jia-Bao; Hu, Hai-Qing & Han, Hui-Lin (2008). "Description of a new species Bocula wuyiensis sp. nov. from China (Lepidoptera: Noctuidae)". Tinea. 20 (4): 213-216.

Rivulinae